Aidan Francis Baker (born 31 December 1964) is a former English cricketer.  Baker was a right-handed batsman who bowled right-arm fast-medium.  He was born at Blackburn, Lancashire.

Baker made his debut in County Cricket for Berkshire in the 1996 Minor Counties Championship against Cornwall.  From 1996 to 1997, he represented the county in 4 Championship matches.

In 1998, he joined Suffolk County Cricket Club, making his debut for the county in the Minor Counties Championship against Buckinghamshire.  From 1998 to 1999, he represented the county in 8 Championship matches, the last of which came against Cumberland.  He also made his debut in the MCCA Knockout Trophy with the county in a match against the Essex Cricket Board.  From 1998 to 1999, he represented the county in 4 Trophy matches, the last of which came against Cambridgeshire.  Baker represented the county in a single List A match against the Hampshire Cricket Board in the 1999 NatWest Trophy.

Returning to Berkshire in 2000, he represented the county in a single Minor Counties Championship match against Herefordshire.  He also played 2 MCCA Knockout Trophy matches against the Essex Cricket Board and Herefordshire.

Baker later represented the Surrey Cricket Board in a single List A match against the Essex Cricket Board in the 2nd round of the 2003 Cheltenham & Gloucester Trophy which was held in 2002.  In his 2 List A matches, he scored a single run and with the ball he took 2 wickets at a bowling average of 33.50, with best figures of 2/67.

References

External links
Aidan Baker at Cricinfo
Aidan Baker at CricketArchive

1964 births
Living people
Cricketers from Blackburn
English cricketers
Berkshire cricketers
Suffolk cricketers
Surrey Cricket Board cricketers